Chiryakovo is a rural locality (a village) in Zaraysky District of Moscow Oblast, Russia, located  east from Zaraysk.

References

Notes

Sources

Rural localities in Zaraysky District, Moscow Oblast